
Year 9 BC was either a common year starting on Wednesday, Thursday or Friday or a leap year starting on Thursday (link will display the full calendar) of the Julian calendar (the sources differ, see leap year error for further information) and a leap year starting on Monday of the Proleptic Julian calendar. At the time, it was known as the Year of the Consulship of Drusus and Crispinus (or, less frequently, year 745 Ab urbe condita). The denomination 9 BC for this year has been used since the early medieval period, when the Anno Domini calendar era became the prevalent method in Europe for naming years.

Events

By place

Roman Empire 
 Pannonia is incorporated into the Roman Empire as part of Illyria.
 The Ara Pacis ("Altar of Augustan Peace"), voted for by the Senate four years earlier, is dedicated.
 Nero Claudius Drusus begins a campaign against the Marcomanni, but dies soon after, due to a fall from his horse.
 Tiberius Claudius Nero continues the conquest of Germania. He is elevated by Emperor Augustus as his heir by succession.

By topic

Arts and sciences 
 Livy completes compilation of his Ab Urbe Condita Libri, covering the history of Rome since its foundation in 142 books.

Births 
 Claudius Livius Fresius (d. AD 57)
 Ping, Chinese emperor of the Han dynasty (d. AD 6)
 Quintus Asconius Pedianus, Roman historian (d. AD 76)

Deaths 
 Nero Claudius Drusus, son of Livia and stepson of Augustus (b. 38 BC)

References